Triplophysa choprai, the snow loach, is a species of ray-finned fish in the genus Triplophysa.

It is named after Bashambhar Nath Chopra.

Footnotes 
 

choprai
Taxa named by Sunder Lal Hora
Fish described in 1934